Istanbul's third electoral district is one of three divisions of the Istanbul electoral district for the purpose of elections to Grand National Assembly of Turkey.  It elects thirty-five members of parliament (deputies) to represent the district for a five-year term by the D'Hondt method, a party-list proportional representation system.

The district partially covers the European side of the Province of Istanbul, on the west of the Bosphorus. The second electoral district is situated to the east while the first electoral district occupies the Anatolian side of Istanbul on the east side of the Bosphorus.

Division
The third electoral district contains the following Istanbul administrative districts (ilçe):

Arnavutköy
Avcılar
Bağcılar
Bahçelievler
Bakırköy
Başakşehir
Beylikdüzü
Büyükçekmece
Çatalca
Esenyurt
Güngören
Küçükçekmece
Silivri

Members 
Population reviews of each electoral district are conducted before each general election, which can lead to certain districts being granted a smaller or greater number of parliamentary seats. Istanbul (III) gained 3 extra seats for the 2011 general election, thus electing 28 seats as opposed to 25 that it elected in 2002 and 2007. In 1999, the district elected 22 MPs.

General elections

2011

References 

Electoral districts of Turkey